In United States civilian law enforcement, a Threat Management Unit is a police department team that provides criminal and behavioral analysis and risk assessments in an attempt to review, and ultimately mitigate, the potential for violence with an emphasis on prevention. Threat Management Units identify risk factors, patterns of escalation, and construct an environment that inhibits or prevents violence. The services provided cover a wide range of topics, including, but not limited to terrorism, school violence, sexual crimes, stalking, cyber crimes (cyber stalking), domestic violence, arson, sabotage, communicated threats, insider threats and pre-attack behavior. Research in this area of law enforcement is known as Threat Safety Science.

Origins
The Los Angeles Police Department created the first Threat Management Unit, the Los Angeles Police Department Threat Management Unit, founded by retired LAPD Captain Robert Martin, in 1990 after the murder of actress Rebecca Lucile Schaeffer.

Threat Management Units have been adopted by many city, county, state and federal law enforcement agencies, including agencies from Canada, Australia, the United Kingdom, Europe, Asia, Hong Kong and South America; as well as private security consultants all seeking to implement a form of TMU for contracted national and foreign jurisdictions.

Notable Programs

Los Angeles Police Department
The Los Angeles Police Department Threat Management Unit was established in 1990. The primary mission of the LAPD TMU is to ensure the safety and well-being of members of the diverse communities of the City of Los Angeles by investigating and managing aggravated cases, both criminal and non-criminal, wherein individuals have demonstrated an abnormal fixation or obsession and have generated a long-term pattern of unsolicited acts of visitation, telephonic or written correspondence in a threatening manner toward a specific person. The LAPD TMU works cooperatively with the Los Angeles Police Department Mental Evaluation Unit (MEU) to evaluate stalking suspects who often suffer from some form of mental instability and workplace violence suspects who experience some form of mental health crisis when they make threats and engage in acts of violence. The MEU, Systemwide Mental Assessment Response Team (SMART) accompanies TMU on all of its calls involving stalkers and workplace violence. Both the TMU and MEU comprise the Crisis Response Support Section (CRSS).

University of Texas at Houston Police Department
The University of Texas at Houston Police Department established a Threat Management Unit under the leadership of Chief William H. Adcox. The Unit is led by Inspector Vicki King and advised by Dr. Gregory H. Botz who provides insight into applications in the healthcare industry. The unit has been credited with a 300% increase in early intervention reporting between 2012 and 2014. Reports indicate that hospital employees feel more comfortable reporting concerning behavior so officers can get these individuals help before their behavior escalates to criminal activity or harm to themselves or others. The unit was involved in 11 suicide interventions in a four-month period where the people investigated were held under an Emergency Detention Order and given psychiatric care. During that same four-month period, the Threat Management Unit intervened in 18 cases in which the subject was considered to be at high risk for committing a violent act. Researchers at the University of Texas MD Anderson Cancer Center  are pioneering threat safety science and principles of de-escalation of threat and risk in order to develop tactical solutions in Threat Safety Science in healthcare.

See also 
Los Angeles Police Department Threat Management Unit
University of Texas at Houston Police Department
Fixated Threat Assessment Centre

References

Law enforcement in the United States